Sing Loud, Sing Proud! is the third studio album from Boston punk rock band the Dropkick Murphys. Before the album's release in 2001, guitarist Rick Barton left the band. He announced James Lynch of Boston punk band The Ducky Boys as his successor. As well as Lynch, the band also recruited then 17-year-old Marc "The Kid" Orrell on lead guitar (he is also a self-taught accordionist). The band also recruited a full-time piper, Robbie Mederios (better known as Spicy McHaggis), and Ryan Foltz on mandolin and tin whistle.

Music videos were released for the songs "The Spicy McHaggis Jig", "The Gauntlet" and "The Wild Rover".

Recording
The album featured a brand new lineup for the Dropkick Murphys compared to their previous album. Founding guitarist Rick Barton quit the band early during the album's recording although he would be featured on three of the album's tracks. Guitarist James Lynch joined the band shortly before Barton's departure while 17 year old guitarist, Marc Orrell was added as well. The new lineup was rounded out by mandolin player, Ryan Foltz and bagpipe player, Spicy McHaggis, who are only featured on this album.

The album features collaborations with Shane MacGowan, vocalist of The Pogues, and Colin McFaull of Cock Sparrer and an updated version of the old Murphys classic "Caps And Bottles". "The Legend of Finn MacCumhail" was previously released on the band's 1998 single, "Curse of a Fallen Soul" and performed on The Gang's All Here tour. In addition, it includes covers of Irish folk classics, "The Rocky Road to Dublin" and "The Wild Rover", as well as a rendition of the Boston College fight song, "For Boston".

Reception

Allmusic gave Sing Loud, Sing Proud! a score of three stars out of five, and called it "a decent addition to the band's album roster." 
Punknews.org gave the album four out of five stars said the album "blends the sounds of 'Do or Die' and 'The Gang's All Here,'" and that "the Murphy’s skill is in blending their folk influences into their street punk sound, without losing the attitude and energy of the latter. This separates the band from acts with similar setups like Flogging Molly."

Cover art
The mural on the cover actually exists in South Boston on the corner of West Broadway and C Streets. The mural was painted by Tricia O'Neill and her father Patrick O'Neill in the summer of 2000. Tricia was hired by Ken Casey and his wife. Their relationship continued - Pat was in the follow up album's video for "Walk Away" and Tricia did the "Blackout" cover and interior photo artwork. The mural is one of the last murals left in South Boston, as others have been painted over.

Track listing
All songs by Al Barr, Ken Casey and Matt Kelly, unless otherwise noted.
"For Boston" (T.J. Hurley) – 1:33
"The Legend of Finn MacCumhail" – 2:15
"Which Side Are You On?" (Florence Reece) – 2:28
"The Rocky Road to Dublin" (Traditional) – 2:37
"Heroes from Our Past"  – 3:31
"Forever" – 3:08
"The Gauntlet" – 2:49
"Good Rats" – 3:03
"The New American Way" – 3:32
"The Torch" – 3:17
"The Fortunes of War" – 2:43
"A Few Good Men" – 2:36
"Ramble and Roll" – 1:59
"Caps and Bottles" (Casey) – 2:41
"The Wild Rover" (Traditional) – 3:25
"The Spicy McHaggis Jig" – 3:27

Personnel
Dropkick Murphys:
Al Barr – vocals
Rick Barton - additional guitars on "The Torch", "The New American Way" and "Fortunes of War" (founding guitarist of the band quit early during the album's recording)
Ken Casey – bass guitar, vocals
Matt Kelly – drums, bodhrán, vocals
James Lynch – guitar, vocals
Marc Orrell – guitar, accordion, vocals
Ryan Foltz – mandolin, tin whistle, dulcimer
Spicy McHaggis – bagpipes on "The Spicy McHaggis Jig" (also credited with "excessive smoking and under-aged drinking" in the album sleeve notes)

additional personnel:
Shane MacGowan – vocals on "Good Rats"
Colin McFaull – vocals on "Fortunes of War"
Desi Queally – vocals on "Rocky Road to Dublin"
Joe Delaney – bagpipes on "Heroes of Our Past" and "For Boston"
Brian Queally – tin whistle on "Rocky Road to Dublin"
Johnny Cunningham – mandolin on "Good Rats"
Andreas Kelly – accordion on "The Torch"
Zack Brines – piano on "Ramble and Roll"
Carl Kelly – uilleann pipes on "Forever"
Jim Siegal – engineer

References

Dropkick Murphys albums
2001 albums
Hellcat Records albums